The Love Nest may refer to:
 The Love Nest (1922 film) aka Das Liebesnest, is a 1922 German silent film directed by Rudolf Walther-Fein.
 The Love Nest (1922), an American film directed by Wray Bartlett Physioc.
 The Love Nest (1923 film), an American short silent comedy by Buster Keaton
 The Love Nest (1933 film), a British comedy directed by Thomas Bentley

See also
 Love Nest, a 1951 American comedy drama film directed by Joseph Newman
 "Love Nest", a song from the 1920 comedy Mary, music by Louis Hirsch and words by Otto Harbach